Aloysius Cornelis (Kees) Smout (30 April 1876 in Bergen op Zoom - 24 August 1961 in Breda) was a Dutch sculptor.

Smout attended the Rijksakademie van beeldende kunsten in Amsterdam. He was a student of Ludwig Jünger, Bart van Hove and Ferdinand Leenhoff. In 1901 he won the second prize in the Dutch Prix de Rome in the category sculpture, three years later he was awarded the first prize. He was a member of the Arti et Amicitiae artist association in Amsterdam.

References 

1876 births
1961 deaths
Dutch sculptors
Dutch male sculptors
Prix de Rome (Netherlands) winners
People from Bergen op Zoom
20th-century sculptors